Beach volleyball was introduced at the 1999 Pan American Games in Winnipeg, Manitoba, Canada, three years after the 1996 Summer Olympics, when the sport made its Olympic debut.

Men's tournament

Women's tournament

Medal table

References
 Sports123

 
Sports at the Pan American Games
Pan American Games